The Port of Philadelphia is located on the Delaware River in Philadelphia in the U.S. state of Pennsylvania.

Generally the term applies to the publicly owned marine terminals located within Philadelphia city limits along west bank of the river. These terminals are managed by the Philadelphia Regional Port Authority, PhilaPort, an agency of the Commonwealth of Pennsylvania. The term is sometimes used for Delaware River port complex to collectively refer to the ports and energy facilities along the river in the tri-state PA-NJ-DE Delaware Valley region. They include the Port of Salem, the Port of Wilmington, the Port of Chester, the Port of Paulsboro, the Port of Philadelphia and the Port of Camden. Combined they create one of the largest shipping areas of the United States. In 2016, 2,427 ships arrived at Delaware River port facilities: Fruit ships were counted at 577, petroleum at 474, and containerized cargo at 431.

PhilaPort (The Philadelphia Regional Port Authority) 
The Philadelphia Regional Port Authority, commonly known as PhilaPort, and referred to as The Port of Philadelphia, is an independent agency of the Commonwealth of Pennsylvania charged with the management, maintenance, marketing, and promotion of port facilities along the Delaware River in Pennsylvania, as well as strategic planning throughout the port district. PhilaPort works with its terminal operators to improve its facilities and to market those facilities to prospective port users around the world. Port cargoes and the activities they generate are responsible for thousands of direct and indirect jobs in the Philadelphia area and throughout Pennsylvania.

On May 22, 2017, The Philadelphia Regional Port Authority (PRPA) announced that it was rebranding as PhilaPort (The Port of Philadelphia) effective immediately. The name ‘PhilaPort’ was decided on to distinguish The Port of Philadelphia from the many other regional authorities.

Terminals

The Port consists of a series of marine terminals, each with specialized capabilities.

The  facility features  of dry, temperature-controlled storage.
Pier 84: This facility is dedicated exclusively to cocoa beans and other cocoa products on 1 berth at a depth of MLW of 32 fet (9.8 meters). The  facility features  of dry storage.
The  facility features  of dry storage.
Philadelphia Automobile Processing Facility: This facility handles automobiles, project cargo, trucks, and heavy equipment just offshore with immediate access to Packer Avenue Marine Terminal and Pier 96. The  facility features an auto-washing and auto service building.

Shipyard
Hog Island was once the largest shipyard in the nation. In 1917, as part of the World War I effort, the US government contracted American International Shipbuilding to build ships and a shipyard at Hog Island. At the time Hog Island was the largest shipyard in the world, with 50 slipways. The first ship (named  for the Lenape name for the site) was christened August 5, 1918, by Edith Bolling Wilson, wife of US president Woodrow Wilson.

The Philly Shipyard is a private company operating on what was once the Philadelphia Naval Shipyard.

Development in the 2000s
Delaware River Main Channel Deepening A project to deepen the Delaware River's 103-mile main shipping channel from 40 to 45 feet began in 2010 and was completed in 2017. The $392 million project was funded by the Federal Government and local-match sponsor PhilaPort (using Commonwealth of Pennsylvania general funds).

Infrastructure Upgrade A $300 million Port Development Plan was announced by the Commonwealth in November 2016, which will expand and improve cargo operations throughout the Port's busiest areas. As part of the $300 million Port Development Plan, the first two of five giant cranes capable of unloading the largest container ships arrived in March 2018 from China, where they were manufactured.

Southport Marine Terminal
An expansion of port facilities at Philadelphia Naval Yard.

New Leadership In August 2016 PhilaPort's Board of Directors hired Jeff Theobald, a maritime industry professional with more than 40 years of experience in terminal operations and shipping logistics, as its new executive director and CEO, to further professionalize the port's operations.

History

The Port of Philadelphia was established more than 300 years ago during the colonial period, and was for a time the busiest port in both that period and the earliest years of the new republic, finally being eclipsed by the Port of New York. In much of the 20th Century, the Port was overseen by the city's Department of Wharves, Docks, and Ferries, which was replaced by the quasi-public Philadelphia Port Corporation in 1964.

In 1989, following the lead of other municipal ports that made overtures to their respective state governments for capital and operating support, the Port of Philadelphia moved from city to state control, with a new agency, the Philadelphia Regional Port Authority, established by the State Legislature's Act 50 of 1989 to run the Port. The Port of Philadelphia has always been a landlord port, with private companies being given leases to run the Port's facilities, with capital and marketing support provided by the Commonwealth and PRPA.

Philadelphia Cruise Terminal
The Philadelphia Cruise Terminal was located at 5100 South Broad Street within the former Philadelphia Naval Shipyard. The Delaware River Port Authority began operating the terminal in 1998 in Building 3, a landmarked 1874 Navy Yard building. Following the September 11 attacks the Philadelphia terminal accommodated some of the ships that had been diverted from New York. Its peak year was 2006 when it handled 36 cruises. By 2011 the schedule had dwindled to just two cruises. The DRPA decided to close the terminal rather than invest additional operating costs or capital improvements. Its demise was attributed to a combination of the economic downturn, increasing size of cruise ships, and six hours needed to navigate the Delaware River before entering open ocean.

See also

Port of Camden, across the Delaware
Port of Paulsboro
Port of Wilmington (Delaware)
Philadelphia Naval Shipyard, located to the southwest along the Delaware River
Philadelphia International Airport, located to the southwest along the Delaware River

References

External links
2016 Philadelphia Regional Port Authority Advertorial
Philadelphia Regional Port Authority - Official website
Port of Philadelphia facilities
History of the Port of Philadelphia

Economy of Philadelphia
Philadelphia
Delaware River
Port authorities in the United States